The following is a list of notable people who come from or who have significant associations with Darwin, Northern Territory, Australia:

Sport
 Robbie Ahmat
 Joe Anderson
 Ben Barba
 Graeme Brown
 Peter Burgoyne
 Anthony Corrie
 Kerry Dienelt
 Frank Farina
 Fabian Francis
 Mark Hickman
 Stephen Holt
 Michael Long
 Jesse Makarounas
 Damien Martyn
 Adrian McAdam
 Gilbert McAdam
 Andrew McLeod
 Paul Miller
 Nova Peris-Kneebone
 Cyril Rioli
 Daniel Rioli
 Maurice Rioli
 Rohan Sajdeh
 Horrie Seden
 Cameron Stokes
 Mathew Stokes
 John Tambouras
 Hamilton Thorp
 Matthew Whelan
 Erika Yamasaki

Arts
 McLean Edwards
 Ted Egan
 The Groovesmiths
 David Gulpilil
 Jessica Mauboy
 Aaron Pedersen
 Rachel Perkins
 Tex Perkins
 The Poor
 Warwick Thornton
 Gregg Turkington

Media
 Charlie King
 Michael Tunn
 Ron Wilson

Politics
 John Anictomatis
 Denis Burke
 Bob Collins
 Paul Everingham
 William Forster
 Stephen Hatton
 Goff Letts
 Brian Frank Martin
 Brian Ross Martin
 Clare Martin
 Dean Mildren
 James Muirhead
 Harold Nelson
 Kevin O'Leary
 Trevor Riley
 Stephen Southwood
 Shane Stone
 Ian Tuxworth

Business
 Sue Wah Chin
 Andrew Liveris
 Lum Loy
 Edward Pretty

Other
 Lillian Dean
 Olga Havnen
 Bruce Litchfield
 Lily Ah Toy
 Alan Powell

Darwin
 
People